Glenn Wilke Jr. is an American collegiate level basketball coach, with 700 victories in 33 seasons. He initially started coaching in Winter Park, Florida an NCAA Division II school.  He is currently a coach for the Rollins College's women's basketball team. where he has a 700–252 record.  His father, Glenn Wilkes Sr., is a Hall of Fame basketball coach.

References

External links
 Rollins profile

Year of birth missing (living people)
Living people
American men's basketball players
American women's basketball coaches
Rollins Tars coaches
Stetson Hatters men's basketball players